Burcester may refer to:

Alternate version of Bicester
William Burcester